Ankit Dane (born 1 April 1990) is an Indian cricketer who plays for Madhya Pradesh. He made his first-class debut on 30 October in the 2015–16 Ranji Trophy. He made his List A debut for Madhya Pradesh in the 2016–17 Vijay Hazare Trophy on 28 February 2017. He made his Twenty20 debut for Madhya Pradesh in the 2017–18 Zonal T20 League on 8 January 2018.

References

External links
 

1990 births
Living people
Indian cricketers
Madhya Pradesh cricketers
People from Madhya Pradesh
Wicket-keepers